Guaita is one of three peaks which overlooks the city of San Marino.

It may also refer to the following people with the surname:

Guaita

 Enrique Guaita (1910–1959), Italian Argentine international footballer
 Inmaculada Guaita Vañó (born 1965), Spanish politician
 Leandro Guaita (born 1986), Argentine footballer
 Ovidio Guaita, Italian journalist and photographer
 Raffaele Guaita (1922–1996), Italian footballer
 Vicente Guaita (born 1987), Spanish footballer

De Guaita

 Stanislas de Guaita (1861–1897), French poet and member of the Rosicrucian Order

Italian-language surnames
Spanish-language surnames